The 2011 Wokingham Borough Council election took place on 5 May 2011 to elect members of Wokingham Unitary Council in Berkshire, England. One third of the council was up for election and the Conservative Party stayed in overall control of the council.

After the election, the composition of the council was:
Conservative 45
Liberal Democrat 9

Background
A total of 72 candidates contested the 18 seats which were up for election. These were 18 Conservative, 17 Liberal Democrat, 16 Labour, 10 Green Party, 10 United Kingdom Independence Party and 1 independent candidates. Councillors standing down at the election included Conservatives Pam Stubbs and Steve Chapman from Barkham and Sonning wards respectively.

Issues in the election included plans for a new supermarket and traffic congestion.

Election result
The results saw the Conservatives hold control of the council after gaining 2 seats from the Liberal Democrats to have 45 of the 54 seats. The Liberal Democrats were reduced to 9 seats after the party lost 2 of the 4 seats they had been defending in Bulmershe and Whitegates and Winnersh. The Conservatives held all 14 seats they had been defending and among the winners for the party was Abdul Loyes, who returned to the council for Loddon one year after losing his seat there.

The Liberal Democrat leader on the council, Pru Bray, put the defeats down to national events, with the party being part of the national coalition government. Meanwhile, the Conservative leader of the council, David Lee, described the results as "brilliant" and attributed them to "hard work" in the campaign and over the previous year.

Ward results

References

External links
Bios of the candidates in the election

2011 English local elections
2011
2010s in Berkshire